Debre Damo, also spelled Debre Dammo, Dabra Dāmmo or Däbrä Dammo), is the name of a flat-topped mountain, or amba, and a 6th-century monastery in Tigray Region of Ethiopia. It is north of Bizet, and north-west of Adigrat, in the Mehakelegnaw Zone of the Tigray Region, close to the border with Eritrea.

Tradition claims that the monastery was founded in the 6th century by Abuna Aregawi.

Part of the monastery was destroyed during the Tigray War, prior to 14 February 2021.

Monastery

The monastery received its first archeological examination by E. Litton, who led a German expedition to northern Ethiopia in the early 20th century. By the time that David Buxton saw the ancient church in the mid-1940s, he found it "on the point of collapse". A few years later, an English architect, DH Matthews, assisted in the restoration of the building, which included the rebuilding of one of its wood and stone walls (a characteristic style of Aksumite architecture).

Thomas Pakenham, who visited the church in 1955, records a tradition that Debre Damo had also once been a royal prison for heirs to the Emperor of Ethiopia, like the better-known Wehni and Amba Geshen. The exterior walls of the church were built of alternating courses of limestone blocks and wood, "fitted with the projecting stumps that Ethiopians call 'monkey heads'". Once inside, Pakenham was in awe of what he saw:

Destruction
On 14 and 15 February 2021 during the Tigray War, Europe External Programme with Africa (EEPA) reported that the monastery had been looted and partly destroyed by the Eritrean Defence Forces. The monastery was first bombed then six EDF soldiers climbed to the plateau of the monastery, killed one monk and looted for manuscripts and treasures. Twelve buildings were described as "completely destroyed".

References

External links
Debre Damo Monastery

History of Ethiopia
Christian monasteries established in the 6th century
Ethiopian Orthodox Tewahedo monasteries
Monolithic churches in Ethiopia
Adigrat
6th-century churches
Cliff dwellings